Rockaway may refer to:

Places in the United States
Rockaway Beach (disambiguation)

New Jersey
Rockaway, New Jersey, a borough in Morris County
Rockaway Township, New Jersey, a township in Morris County
Rockaway Creek (New Jersey), a tributary of the Lamington River in Hunterdon County
Rockaway River, a tributary of the Passaic River

New York
Rockaway, Queens, a peninsula in the New York City borough of Queens, on Long Island
Far Rockaway, Queens, a neighborhood on the Rockaway peninsula
Rockaway Avenue (disambiguation), subway stations in Brooklyn, New York City
Rockaway Boulevard, a boulevard in Southern Queens
Rockaway Inlet, a strait off Long Island, New York
Rockaway Parkway, a parkway in Brooklyn
East Rockaway, New York, a village in Nassau County on Long Island

Elsewhere
Rockaway, Ohio, an unincorporated community
Rockaway Creek (California)

Ships
 , a United States Navy seaplane tender in commission from 1943 to 1946
 , a United States Coast Guard cutter in commission from 1949 to 1972

Other uses
Rockaway (2017 film), drama-film
Rockaway (carriage), two types of carriage
Rockaway Indians
Eytan Rockaway, American film director
The dance referred to in the Fat Joe song "Lean Back"
"Rockaway" (Beres Hammond song), a 2003 single from the album Can't Stop A Man

See also